The Crocker Motorcycle Company is an American manufacturer, based in Los Angeles, California, of single-cylinder speedway racing motorcycles from 1932, powerful V-twin road motorcycles from 1936, and the "Scootabout," one of the first modern styled motor scooters, in the late 1930s. Production ceased in 1942. In 1999 Crocker Motorcycle Company was resurrected to manufacture authentic OEM replacement parts and now produces complete Small and Big Tank Crockers in southern California, following the original specifications.
Michael Schacht is Crocker Motorcycle company President.

Original Crocker company

Over 30 speedway motorcycles were produced before Al Crocker began work on creating a V-twin motorcycle. The first V-twin entry for Crocker had a 61 in³ (1,000 cc) "Hemi Head" producing 55-60 hp, exceeding the horsepower produced of both the Indian and Harley of the day (38-40 hp). Many Crockers were manufactured to order, with the 91+ cubic inch (about 1,491 cc) being the largest capacity production motorcycle of the time. When production ceased in 1942, approximately 100 of the V-twins had been produced in all. The remaining inventory of parts were sold in 1947 to Elmo Looper. Many of these parts went into restorations of the surviving examples, of which at least 68 exist today, according to a registry started by Charles "Chuck" Vernon and Johnny Eagles, two members of a group of original Crocker owners in Southern California. Although total production of all models is not known, it is thought by some to be around 200 units (about 40–50 speedway, 40–50 "Scootabout" scooters, and 100+ V-Twins).  Al Crocker also produced an overhead valve conversion kit in the late 1920s for the Indian 101 "Scout".

The proprietor and founder of the company, Albert Crocker, ceased motorcycle production in 1942 when the war effort put a shortage on critical materials. Indian and Harley received contracts with the US Army for military motorcycle production and Crocker received  a contract with Douglas Aircraft making aircraft parts. That became a more lucrative business for Al Crocker than motorcycle manufacturing, and in 1942 Crocker Motorcycle became Crocker Manufacturing. Crocker later sold out to a company named Borg Warner. Al Crocker died in 1961. Designer of many of the components, Paul Bigsby, went on to fame as a designer of guitars and particularly of the Bigsby vibrato tailpiece.

Crockers are among the most expensive motorcycles. At the MidAmerica Auctions motorcycle auction in January 2007 in Las Vegas, a 1941 Crocker big tank motorcycle sold for $230,000. At the Gooding & Co. auction in 2006 in Chandler, a 1931 Crocker 61 sold for $236,500. At the Bonhams & Butterfield 2006 auction in New York, a 1937 Crocker "Hemi-head" V-Twin brought $276,500. At the 2006 auction of Bator International in California, a 1939 Crocker 61 cubic-inch side valve model sold for $200,000. The most recent Crocker Motorcycle sold through Mecum Motorcycle Auction in Las Vegas, January 2019, and achieved a record-breaking $704,000 sale price. At the Mecum Monterey Auction, August 2019 1936 Crocker Small Tank achieved a record $750,000

References

External links
Crocker Motorcycle Company Official Website.

 
The Crocker Motorcycle - Jay Leno's Garage

Defunct motorcycle manufacturers of the United States
Manufacturing companies based in Los Angeles
Vehicle manufacturing companies established in 1932
Vehicle manufacturing companies disestablished in 1942
1932 establishments in California
1942 establishments in California